Lithogenes villosus is a species of armored catfish found in the Essequibo River drainage of the Potaro River in Guyana.

References
Schaefer, S.A. and F. Provenzano, 2008. The Lithogeninae (Siluriformes, Loricariidae): anatomy, interrelationships, and description of a new species. Am. Mus. Novit. 3637:1-49.

Loricariidae
Catfish of South America
Fish of Guyana
Taxa named by Carl H. Eigenmann
Fish described in 1909